Aleksi Elorinne (born 3 February 1990) is a Finnish professional ice hockey player who is currently playing with Dragons de Rouen in the Ligue Magnus (FRA). He has formerly played with Tappara and Ilves in the Finnish Liiga.

References

External links

1990 births
Living people
Dragons de Rouen players
Finnish ice hockey defencemen
Ilves players
Tappara players
People from Joensuu
Sportspeople from North Karelia
21st-century Finnish people